Gladis Aurora López Calderón (born 25 January 1960) is a Honduran politician. She is currently the sixth vice president of the National Congress of Honduras. She served as President of the Central Executive Committee of the National Party between 2014 and 2017.

Biography
Her childhood was with her parents and five siblings, two women and three men, all of whom grew up in the municipality of Marcala. López attended high school at the Anna D. Betchold Evangelical School in San Pedro Sula, achieving her title of Bilingual Secretary, she continued with her Bachelor of Tourism studies at LaSalle College in Canada in 1980.

Personal life
Upon her return to Honduras, López worked for a time in the Tan-Sahsa company, performing as an excellent employee and also rendered her services to the hydroelectric company "El Cajón" where she earned the respect of her co-workers, then returned to her town and with her husband Arnold Castro, worked to start a family and had three daughters, Ana Lucia, Gracia Maria and Megan. One of them had been murdered in 2008, when Gracia María Castro López was kidnapped and found dead in a brush in the Milpa Grande village, south of the capital.

References

1960 births
Living people
People from La Paz Department (Honduras)
Deputies of the National Congress of Honduras
National Party of Honduras politicians